Magoula is a suburban town of Athens and former community (pop. 4,992 in 2011) of West Attica, Greece. Since the 2011 local government reform it is part of the municipality Elefsina, of which it is a municipal unit. The municipal unit has an area of 18.134 km2.

Magoula is located 2 km east of Mandra, 5 km north of Elefsina and 21 km northwest of central Athens. The municipal unit of Magoúla also includes the village of Néos Póntos (pop. 257). Magoula is served by a station on the Athens Airport–Patras railway. Motorway 6 runs southeast of the town.

Historical population

Gallery

References

External links
GTP Travel Pages (Municipality) (in English and Greek)

Elefsina
Populated places in West Attica